The Francis Crick Medal and Lecture is  a prize lecture of the Royal Society established in 2003 with an endowment from Sydney Brenner, the late Francis Crick's close friend and former colleague. It is delivered annually in biology, particularly the areas which Francis Crick worked (genetics, molecular biology and neurobiology), and also to theoretical work.  The medal is also intended for young scientists, i.e. under 40, or at career stage corresponding to being under 40 should their career have been interrupted.

List of lectures
Laureates include: 

 2022  for making fundamental advances in the molecular, cellular and circuit bases of neuronal computation and for successfully linking these to animal decision behaviour
 2021 Serena Nik-Zainal for enormous contributions to understanding the aetiology of cancers by her analyses of mutation signatures in cancer genomes, which is now being applied to cancer therapy
 2020 Marta Zlatic for discovering how neural circuits generate behaviour by developing and disseminating definitive techniques, and by discovering fundamental principles governing circuit development and function
 2019 Gregory Jefferis for his fundamental discoveries concerning the development and functional logic of sensory information processing
 2018 Miratul Muqit in recognition of his research on cell signalling linked to neurodegeneration in Parkinson’s disease
 2017  for transforming our understanding of meiotic recombination and of human population history.
 2016 Madan Babu Mohan for his major and widespread contributions to computational biology
 2015 Rob Klose for his research on how chromatin-based and epigenetic processes contribute to gene regulation
 2014 Duncan Odom for his pioneering work in the field of comparative functional genomics
 2013 Matthew Hurles on Mutations: great and small
 2012 Sarah Teichmann on Finding patterns in genes and proteins: decoding the logic of molecular interactions
 2011 Simon Boulton on Repairing the code
 2010 Gilean McVean on 'Our genomes, our history
 2009  on Reprogramming the code of life
 2008 Simon Fisher on A molecular window into speech and language
 2007 Geraint Rees on Decoding consciousness
 2006 Dario Alessi on Deciphering disease
 2005 Daniel Wolpert on The puppet master: how the brain controls the body
 2004 Julie Ahringer on Genes, worms and the new genetics
 2003 Ewan Birney on Being human: what our genome tells us

See also

 List of genetics awards

References

Annual events in the United Kingdom
2003 establishments in the United Kingdom
Biology education in the United Kingdom
Genetics awards
Genetics in the United Kingdom
Recurring events established in 2003
Royal Society lecture series